Karen Grogan is an Australian politician. She was appointed as a Senator for South Australia on 21 September 2021, to fill a casual vacancy caused by the death of Alex Gallacher.

Grogan was born to Irish parents in London, England. Her father Larry Grogan was a shop steward with the Transport and General Workers' Union. She moved to Australia in 1990 and became an Australian citizen four years later.

Grogan was previously CEO of the South Australian Council of Social Service (SACOSS) until 2009, when she worked as chief of staff to the federal MP for Hindmarsh, Mark Butler. In 2019, she joined the United Voice trade union as a senior political officer. Shortly afterwards, United Voice merged with the National Union of Workers to form the United Workers Union (UWU), and Grogan succeeded David Gray as convenor of the PLUS (Progressive Left Unions and Sub-branches) faction.

References

External links

Year of birth missing (living people)
Living people
Australian Labor Party members of the Parliament of Australia
Members of the Australian Senate
Members of the Australian Senate for South Australia
Women members of the Australian Senate
Labor Left politicians
Australian trade unionists
English emigrants to Australia
Australian people of Irish descent